Wiggenhall St Germans SSSI is a  geological Site of Special Scientific Interest south of King's Lynn in Norfolk. It is a Geological Conservation Review site.

This site provides evidence for sea level changes during the Quaternary period, the last 2.6 million years. There are three peat layers, interspersed with fine-grained clastic rocks, and they have been studied with pollen and  foraminifera analyses.

A public footpath crosses the site.

References

Sites of Special Scientific Interest in Norfolk
Geological Conservation Review sites